Damion Thomas (born June 29, 1999) is a Jamaican sprinter who specialises in the 110 and 60m hurdles.

A student at Louisiana State University (LSU), he was the fastest qualifier but ultimately came fourth in the final of the 2017 Pan American U20 Athletics Championships. Then, on the 23 June 2018, he equaled Wilhem Belocian's 110m hurdle junior world record of 12.99s when winning the Junior National Championships in Kingston, Jamaica. He then won the 110m hurdles at the 2018 IAAF World U20 Championships.

He won the 2021 NCAA Indoor 60m hurdle title, broke the LSU school record, and became the fifth-fastest hurdler in NCAA history.

At the 2020 Summer Games Thomas ran 13.54 seconds to get through his heat and then ran 13.39 seconds to finish third in his semi final in the 110m hurdles.

References

External links
 LSU Tigers bio

1999 births
Living people
Jamaican male hurdlers
LSU Tigers track and field athletes
Athletes (track and field) at the 2020 Summer Olympics
Olympic athletes of Jamaica